Maysar Ali Musa Abdullah al-Juburi, also known as Abu Mariya al-Qahtani, is an Iraqi Islamic militant fighting in the Syrian Civil War. He was formerly a commander and Shura Council member in Jabhat al-Nusra.

History

He was born on 1 June 1976 in Al-Shura in the Mosul District of Nineveh Governorate, Iraq. Prior to the 2003 Iraq war, he was a student at the University of Mosul and a member of Fedayeen Saddam. After the fall of the Ba'athist government, he joined the Iraqi Police in Mosul but later left and was eventually arrested. While in Al-Qaeda in Iraq, he served as the head of the religious police.

Move to Syria

He was sent to Syria with Abu Mohammad al-Julani in 2011 by ISI leadership and served on the Shura council of Jabhat Al-Nusra. While being a subordinate of ISI as it was the parent organization of Jabhat Al-Nusra he was a known vocal critic of Abu Bakr Al-Baghdadi and made multiple attempts for the Al-Nusra Front to separate from ISI which caused a rift among members within Al-Nusra. While also advocating for a separation from ISI. While also advocating for a separation from not just ISI but Al-Qaeda as a whole he expressed dissatisfaction with fellow leadership in the Al-Nusra Front including Abu Mohammad al-Julani, it is also alleged he considered forming his own group. He is also known to be a supporter of Turkish operations in Syria even though Tahrir al-Sham's official stance is against the intervention and he allegedly assassinated rival leaders in Tahrir al-Sham in an effort to support the Turkish operation. Abu Maria Al-Qahtani has also been involved in infighting between factions as well as internal disputes in Al-Nusra itself, which caused him to later be dismissed from his position as general Sharia official in 2014 however he is still very influential and close to the leadership of Tahrir al-Sham.

In 2016, he was allegedly involved in the formation of Ahrar al-Sharqiya, which is a group composed of individuals exiled from the Deir ez-Zor Governorate, many of which were formerly fighters from Ahrar al-Sham and Jabhat al-Nusra, the group took part in the Turkish military operation in Afrin. His involvement and affiliation with Ahrar al-Sharqiya is unknown, and has been largely doubted by many observers and analysts, however a commander in Ahrar al-Sharqiya, Abu Ishaq al-Ahwazi had previously praised Qahtani in 2016 during an interview after the group's formation, Ahwazi later left Ahrar al-Sharqiya and joined the Syrian Democratic Forces and was killed in an IED attack by the ISIS in the town of Busayrah in Deir ez-Zor.

References

Al-Qaeda leaders
Iraqi al-Qaeda members
Al-Nusra Front members
Members of al-Qaeda in Iraq
Living people
People from Nineveh Governorate
University of Mosul alumni
1976 births